A major part of the Russian Revolution of 1905 took place in the Russian Partition of Poland and lasted until 1907 (see Congress Poland and Privislinsky Krai). It was the largest wave of strikes and widest emancipatory movement that Poland had ever seen until the 1970s and the 1980s. One of the major events of that period was the insurrection in Łódź in June 1905. Throughout that period, many smaller demonstrations and armed struggles between the peasants and workers on one side and the government on the other took place. The demands of the demonstrators included the improvement of the workers' living conditions, as well as political freedoms, particularly related to increased autonomy for Poland. Particularly in 1905, Poland was at the verge of a new uprising, revolution or civil war. Some Polish historians even consider the events of that period a fourth Polish uprising against the Russian Empire.

Background 

Worsening economic conditions (the recession of 1901-1903) contributed to mounting political tensions in the Russian Empire, including Poland; the economy of the Kingdom of Poland was also being significantly hit by the aftershocks of the Russo-Japanese War; by late 1904 over 100,000 Polish workers had lost their jobs. Conscriptions to the Russian army, and ongoing russification policies further aggravated the Polish population. News and attitudes of the 1905 Russian revolution quickly spread from Saint Petersburg (where demonstrators were massacred on January 22) across the Russian Empire and into Russian-controlled Poland. This was capitalized on by factions in Russia and Poland that wanted more or less radical changes.

In the meantime, two factions among the Polish political leaders clashed. The wing of the Polish Socialist Party (Polska Partia Socjalistyczna, PPS) that was loyal to Józef Piłsudski believed that Poles must show their determination to regain independence through active, violent protests against the Russians. This view was not shared by Roman Dmowski's National Democratic Party (endecja) nor by the PPS' own "Left" (or "Young") wing. The National Democrats believed that the Poles should work together with the Russian authorities and increase their representation in the Duma (Russian parliament), while the PPS Left wanted to work together with Russian revolutionaries to topple the Tsar and saw the creation of a socialist society as more important than Polish independence.

Revolution
During the 19th century, Łódź had become a major Polish industrial centre. h
Heavily urbanized and industrialized, it was a stronghold of the socialist movement. By January 22, 1905, workers in Łódź had been strike, and on January 31, tsarist police reported that the strikers carried placards with the slogans "Down with the autocracy! Down with the war!". Similarly in Warsaw, the former capital of Poland and another major industrial centre, uprisings and demonstrations were common. There was a general strike in Warsaw on January 14 and over 90 fatalities in the city over the next few days. On January 17, the Russian government declared that Warsaw was under a state of siege.

On 28 January, the PPS and the Social Democracy of the Kingdom of Poland and Lithuania called for a general strike. Over 400,000 workers became involved in strikes all over Poland that lasted for four weeks. That was only a prelude to an even larger series of strikes that rocked Poland over next year. In 1905 to 1906, close to 7,000 strikes and other work stoppages occurred, involving 1.3 million Poles. Protesters demanded improved conditions for workers and more political freedom for the Poles. By February, students at Polish universities had joined the demonstrations to protest Russification and demand the right to study in the Polish language. They were joined by high school pupils and even some from the elementary schools. The Russian government gave in and agreed to some concessions towards the Polish nationalist movement by removing some restrictions on the use of Polish in the classrooms, many, particularly the workers, were still dissatisfied. In some places in Poland, the school strikes lasted for nearly three years. Major demonstrations occurred on May 1 (Labour Day), and about 30 people were shot during a demonstration in Warsaw. Later that month, public order disintegrated in Warsaw for a time during a spontaneous campaign against both the criminal elements and the Russian collaborators.

In mid-June 1905, Russian police opened fire on one of many workers' demonstrations in Łódź. The resulting Łódź insurrection saw several days of fighting within the cities and over 2000 casualties, including over 1p0 fatalities among the civilians. Several protests and strikes occurred in major Polish cities under Russian control throughout the year, but as the Polish journalist Włodzimierz Kalicki wrote, the Łódź insurrection was the most dramatic one. The Russian government contributed to the chaos by trying to incite some anti-Jewish pogroms. Another notable occurrence was the establishment of the Zagłębie Republic (Republika Zagłębiowska), a Polish socialist statelet centred around the region of Zagłębie Dąbrowskie that existed from October to November 1905. A similar socialist state of the Ostrowiec Republic (Republika Ostrowiecka) around the city of Ostrowiec Świętokrzyski existed from late December 1905 to mid-January 1906.

Aftermath

Most of the unrest occurred in 1905, but until 1906-1907, worker unrest, demonstrations and occasional armed clashes continued to occur in Poland. Strikes in Łódź continued until mid-1906, when only the large Russian military presence and mass layoffs of striking workers from the factories pacified the city. The unrest in Poland forced the Russians to keep an army of 250,000-300,000 soldiers there, an army even larger than the one fighting the Japanese in the east.

Piłsudski's Combat Organization of the Polish Socialist Party, founded in 1904, contributed to some escalation of the hostilities and became more active during the over few years. It started its campaign of assassinations and robberies mostly from 1906, but it grew much less active towards the end of the decade. Piłsudski's faction was temporarily weakened, and the PPS split; however, by 1909, Piłsudski's faction had again regained prominence on the Polish underground political scene. Piłsudski eventually succeeded in securing Polish independence and became an important political figure in interwar Poland.

Another consequence was the evolution of Polish political parties and thought. National consciousness had risen among the Polish peasants. Despite the failure to achieve the most radical goals of the revolution, the Russian government conceded some of the demands, both in the social and in the political spheres, which counteracted the defeatist feelings among many Poles, who still remembered the total defeat of previous uprisings. In particular, Russification was partially reversed in education in Poland.

Gallery

See also
 Bloody Wednesday (Poland)
 Warszawianka (1905)

References

Further reading
Robert E. Blobaum, Rewolucja: Russian Poland, 1904-1907, Cornell University Press, 1995
Robert Blobaum, The Revolution of 1905-1907 and the Crisis of Polish Catholicism, Slavic Review, Vol. 47, No. 4 (Winter, 1988), pp. 667–686, JSTOR
Richard D Lewis, Revolution in the countryside : Russian Poland, 1905-1906, Center for Russian and East European Studies, University of Pittsburgh, 1986
Miaso J., he Struggle for National School in the Kingdom of Poland in the Years 1905-1907 (A Centenary of the School Strike), Rozprawy z Dziejow Oswiaty (Studies in the History of Education), year: 2005, vol: 44, number:, pages: 75-103, 
Andrew Stanislaus John Pomykalski, The Polish Insurrection of 1905 during the Russian Revolution of 1905, Thesis (M.A.)--San Jose State University, 1982.
Scott Ury, Barricades and Banners: The Revolution of 1905 and the Transformation of Warsaw Jewry, Stanford University Press, 2012.  
, Stanisław Wiech (ed.), Rewolucja 1905-1907 w Królestwie Polskim i w Rosji, KOBD, 2005
Andrew Kier Wise, Aleksander Lednicki : a Pole among Russians, a Russian among Poles : Polish-Russian reconciliation in the Revolution of 1905, Columbia University Press, 2003

External links

 Rewolucja 1905 website about the Revolution in the Kingdom of Poland

1905 in Poland
1906 in Poland
1907 in Poland
1905 in the Russian Empire
1906 in the Russian Empire
1907 in the Russian Empire
Conflicts in 1905
Conflicts in 1906
Conflicts in 1907
Congress Poland
Rebellions in Poland
1905 Russian Revolution
Civil wars involving the states and peoples of Europe
20th-century rebellions
Civil wars of the Industrial era